The Embassy of Burkina Faso in Washington, D.C. is the diplomatic mission of Burkina Faso to the United States. 
It is located at 2340 Massachusetts Avenue, Northwest, Washington, D.C., in the Embassy Row neighborhood.

The Ambassador is Mr. Seydou Kabore.

Before 1978, the building hosted services of the embassy of the Republic of China.

References

External links
Official website
wikimapia

Burkina Faso
Washington, D.C.
Burkina Faso–United States relations
Burkina Faso